The Bandini 1000 sports prototype is an Italian racing car built in 1972 by Bandini Cars.

This car marked some significant changes in the landscape of production Bandini.
Presented an original color orange, suffered an accident to "Targa Florio", 1972 and in repair, Ilario Bandini decided to change its color in this shade of blue. Today is red and blue.
At the presentation the wheel rims were aluminium Campagnolo, in 1975 were replaced by new Bandini central hub with six to eight races in aluminium and half dismantled. One development is also in the size and position of rear monoplane wing that compared the presentation is moved upward and increased in width.

The chassis

The frame, while maintaining continuity in particular as regards the choice of systems suspensive (modified only in the position of attacks) undergoes a radical change in the provision and choice of the section of the tubes that form the structure. The highest mark on the land of tyres and the changed composition of the compound and carcass demanded a greater torsional rigidity in order to draw the full benefit.
It was thus achieved a trellis tube section mixed square, round and rectangular.
It also changed the position of the driver who assumes a more lying.
 
 Structure and material:frame of mixed: square, round and rectangular tubes in special steel
 Suspension:
 Front: Independent, triangles overlapping with shock hydraulic telescopic tilted and springs cylindrical helical coaxial; bar stabilizing, camber adjustable
 Rear: Independent, triangle and lower arms swinging shock hydraulic telescopic inclined agents on portamozzo, torsion bar, camber, caster and toe adjustable
 Braking system:
 Service: hydraulics, disc front and rear
 Steering: a pinion and cremegliera
 Guide: left
 Wheels: Alloy  Bandini
 Fuel tank: 
 Transmission: differential and return rear halfshaft reached with omocinetici

Engine

On innovative chassis is mounted an engine of proven reliability and power: Bandini 1000 cc engine capacity with aluminum rods and camshafts on casters that previously had equipped the 1000/66 and Saloncino which now reaches 118 CV.
The frame of Bandini s.p. 1000 was later also used for testing the first version of the engine 1300 cc based monoblock Fiat.
The change in merger only with the differential is a Colotti to five reports more reverse gears.

 Positioning: longitudinal rear, 4-cylinder in-line
 Materials and particularity: double camshaft Head alloy  a chamber burst and pistons air emisferico, distribution chain with trees to tenditore cams on roller bearings, monoblock and base to five media bench in a single fusion and sump alloy of aluminum, chrome pipes of cylinders and to dismantle, aluminium rods.
 Bore: 
 Stroke: 
 Displacement: 987 cc
 Compression ratio: 9:1
 Fuel system: 2 Weber carburetors double body 38DCO3
 Power:  @ 8000 rpm
 Lubricate: Carter with wet gear pump and filter external cooler
 Cooling: forced liquid with centrifugal pump controlled by pulley and belt, cooler on the front
 Gearbox and clutch: 5 synchronized speed + RG clutch single dry disc
 Ignition and electrical equipment: coil and distributor on the head, battery 12 V and generator

The body

The body is composed of a front with air-intake low, square and very large, with a large vent hot air in front for the passenger as in 1000 V changed; however, is for the first time, realized in composite: fiberglass and epoxy resin, set through rapid hooks that allow a quick replacement.
The cockpit area is coated panels in aluminium, while the fairing over the rear wheels, which is also fiberglass, complete the body that leaves the central rear of the first real wing adjustable incidence adopted by Bandini.

See also
 Ilario Bandini
 Bandini Cars

Bandini vehicles
Sports prototypes
1970s cars
Sports cars
Cars introduced in 1972